"Ice Cold Ice" is a song by Hüsker Dü from their album Warehouse: Songs and Stories. The song was released in the United Kingdom as both an EP and a single.

The song, written and sung by Bob Mould, features a call and response between Mould and backing vocalist Grant Hart similar to some of the group's previous songs, such as "Makes No Sense At All". It has an unusual ending - it appears to be a fade-out at first, but just as it fades to nothing, a thunderous final chord brings the song to a conclusion. The live version of the B-side song "The Wit & The Wisdom" has lyrics though they are hard to decipher. The original instrumental appeared on the album Flip Your Wig.

This was the band's final release before breaking up in January 1988.

Track listing
EP
Side One
"Ice Cold Ice" (Mould)
Side Two
"Gotta Lotta" (Mould)
Medley -- "Reoccuring Dreams" (Mould, Norton, Hart), "The Wit & The Wisdom" (Mould), "Reoccuring Dreams" (Mould, Norton, Hart), "What's Going On?" (Hart), intro to "Green Eyes" (Hart)

Single
Side One
"Ice Cold Ice" (Mould)
Side Two
"Gotta Lotta" (Mould)

References 

Hüsker Dü songs
1987 EPs
Albums produced by Bob Mould